The Manaosbiidae are a family of neotropical harvestmen within the suborder Laniatores.

Name
The name of the type genus is combined from Manaus and Ancient Greek bios "living".

Description
Body length ranges from about three to ten millimeters. Most species are dark brown with black mottling. Appendages are in general much lighter, often with dark rings.

Distribution
The Manaosbiidae occur south from Panama, with a southern limit in Mato Grosso do Sul (Brazil). They inhabit lowland Amazonian rainforest up to submontane Andean forests, dry forests in Central America, and riparian forests in Brazil.

Relationships
The relationship of Manaosbiidae with other families within the Gonyleptoidea is unclear.

Species

Manaosbiinae

 Azulamus Roewer, 1957
 Azulamus scabrissimus Roewer, 1957 – Peru
 Barrona Goodnight & Goodnight, 1942
 Barrona williamsi Goodnight & Goodnight, 1942 – Panama
 Belemnodes Strand, 1942
 Belemnodes scaber (Roewer, 1932)
 Belemulus Roewer, 1932
 Belemulus annulatus Roewer, 1932 – Brazil
 Bugabitia Roewer, 1915
 Bugabitia triacantha Roewer, 1915 – Panama
 Camelianus Roewer, 1912
 Camelianus fuhrmanni Roewer, 1912 – Colombia
 Clavicranaus Roewer, 1915
 Clavicranaus tarsalis Roewer, 1915 – Suriname, Brazil
 Cucutacola Mello-Leitão, 1940
 Cucutacola nigra Mello-Leitão, 1940 – Colombia
 Dibunostra Roewer, 1943
 Dibunostra ypsilon Roewer, 1943 – Venezuela
 Gonogotus Roewer, 1943
 Gonogotus areolatus Roewer, 1943 – Colombia
 Manaosbia Roewer, 1943
 Manaosbia scopulata Roewer, 1943 – Brazil
 Mazarunius Roewer, 1943
 Mazarunius oedipus Roewer, 1943 – Guyana
 Meridia Roewer, 1913
 Meridia palpalis Roewer, 1913 – Venezuela
 Meridia gracilis (Roewer, 1913) – Suriname
 Narcellus Kury & Alonso-Zarazaga, 2011
 Narcellus balthazar (Roewer, 1932) – Windward Islands
 Narcellus montgomeryi (Goodnight & Goodnight, 1947) – Trinidad
 Paramicrocranaus H. Soares, 1970
 Paramicrocranaus difficilis H. Soares, 1970 – Brazil
 Pentacranaus Roewer, 1963
 Pentacranaus niger Roewer, 1963 – Peru
 Poassa Roewer, 1943
 Poassa limbata Roewer, 1943 – Costa Rica
 Poecilocranaus Roewer, 1943
 Poecilocranaus gratiosus Roewer, 1943 – Venezuela
 Rhopalocranaus Roewer, 1913
 Rhopalocranaus albilineatus Roewer, 1932 – Trinidad
 Rhopalocranaus apiculatus Roewer, 1932 – Brazil
 Rhopalocranaus aspersus Roewer, 1932 – Brazil
 Rhopalocranaus atroluteus Roewer, 1913 – Colombia
 Rhopalocranaus bordoni Silhavy, 1979 – Venezuela
 Rhopalocranaus crulsi Mello-Leitão, 1932
 Rhopalocranaus festae Roewer, 1925 – Ecuador
 Rhopalocranaus gracilis Roewer, 1913 – Venezuela
 Rhopalocranaus limbatus (Schenkel, 1953) – Venezuela
 Rhopalocranaus marginatus Roewer, 1913 – French Guiana, Brazil
 Rhopalocranaus robustus Goodnight & Goodnight, 1942 — Guyana
 Rhopalocranaus tenuis (Roewer, 1943) – Suriname
 Rhopalocranaus tuberculatus Goodnight & Goodnight, 1942 – Guyana
 Rhopalocranaus ypsilon Roewer, 1913 – Colombia
 Rhopalocranellus Roewer, 1925
 Rhopalocranellus festae Roewer, 1925 – Ecuador
 Sanvincentia Roewer, 1943
 Sanvincentia tarsalis Roewer, 1943 – Virgin Islands, St. Vincent
 Saramacia Roewer, 1913
 Saramacia alvarengai Kury, 1997 – Brazil
 Saramacia annulata (Mello-Leitão, 1931) – Brazil
 Saramacia aurilimbata Roewer, 1913 – Suriname
 Saramacia lucasae (R. d. L. S. Jim & H. E. M. Soares, 1991) – Brazil
 Semostrus Roewer, 1943
 Semostrus tarsalis Roewer, 1943 – Colombia
 Syncranaus Roewer, 1913
 Syncranaus cribrum Roewer, 1913 – Brazil
 Tegyra Sørensen, 1932
 Tegyra cinnamomea Sørensen, 1932 – Peru
 Zygopachylus Chamberlin, 1925
 Zygopachylus albomarginis Chamberlin, 1925 – Panama
 unknown genus 
 unknown genus calcar (Roewer, 1943) – Venezuela
 unknown genus albituberculatus (Roewer, 1943) – Guyana
 unknown genus strinatii (V. Silhavy, 1979) – Venezuela

Footnotes

References
 Joel Hallan's Biology Catalog: Manaosbiidae
  (eds.) (2007): Harvestmen – The Biology of Opiliones. Harvard University Press 

Harvestman families